William (died 10 September 1056) was the Margrave of the Nordmark from 1051 until his death. He was the eldest son and successor of the Margrave Bernard by a daughter of Vladimir the Great. He died fighting the Slavs in the Battle of Pritzlawa. Upon his death, he was succeeded by his half-brother Otto as Margrave of the Nordmark.

Sources
Medieval Lands Project: Nobility of Brandenburg.
Bury, J. B. (editor), The Cambridge Medieval History: Volume III, Germany and the Western Empire, Cambridge University Press, 1922, page 306

Margraves of the Nordmark
1056 deaths
Year of birth unknown